Frank Louis Lindley (1885–1947) was an English professional footballer who played in the Scottish League for Motherwell and Dundee as an outside right. He made one appearance in the Football League for Sheffield United.

Personal life 
Lindley served in three battalions of the Middlesex Regiment during the First World War, most notably the 1st Football Battalion. He was posted to France in November 1915 and sustained a gunshot wound to the arm at Delville Wood in August 1916, which resulted in him being evacuated to Mater Infirmorum Hospital in Belfast. He returned to France in March 1917, but was sent to hospital in Sheffield with impetigo in July 1917.

Career statistics

References

External links 

 

English footballers
English Football League players
Association football outside forwards
Dundee F.C. players
British Army personnel of World War I
Middlesex Regiment soldiers
Motherwell F.C. players
Sheffield United F.C. players
Southern Football League players
1885 births
1947 deaths
Footballers from Sheffield
Newport County A.F.C. players
Luton Town F.C. players
Scottish Football League players
St Bernard's F.C. players
Date of birth unknown
Date of death unknown
Place of death unknown